The Embry–Riddle Observatory is an astronomical observatory owned and operated by Embry-Riddle Aeronautical University, Daytona Beach. Hosting an array of optical instruments, this observatory is situated on the roof of the College of Arts and Sciences building in Daytona Beach, Florida.

History
Embry-Riddle Observatory, originally known as Embry-Riddle Creekside Observatory, began in a Technical Innovations Pro-Dome  dome located between the Lehman Engineering Building and a creek that ran through campus. In 2012, Embry-Riddle broke ground on the new 140,000 sq-ft College of Arts and Sciences building which included a  Ash Dome on the roof. Upon completion of the building, existing telescopes were moved from the Creekside Observatory to the new building and the university installed a new 1-meter Ritchey–Chrétien telescope in June, 2014.

General information
The fifth floor of the College of Arts and Sciences building is used exclusively for astronomy and astronomical research. A rooftop veranda hosts six steel piers for supporting a fleet of Software Bisque Paramount telescope mounts. The fifth floor classroom houses the primary telescope control room and various apparati for astronomy and astrophotography instruction. A dedicated workshop holds all the eyepieces, cameras, adapters, and various support equipment needed to maintain the telescopes. The primary  dome weighs  and is elevated above the classroom. A smaller  diameter dome housing a heliostat sits atop the classroom roof. The portable telescopes are stored in a dehumidified storage room on the veranda.

Structural
The primary telescope is supported by a 4-story,  steel truss located inside the building. The steel structure, designed by Leo A Daly and built by Trinity Fabricators, was erected during the early stages of the building's construction. The College of Arts and Sciences building was finished around the truss, leaving a  minimum gap between the truss and the building on all levels. The concrete pads for the truss are separated from the building foundation by insulating foam. This isolation prevents building vibrations from coupling into the telescope structure.

Usage
The Embry-Riddle Observatory is used primarily for faculty and student teaching and research. Both undergraduate and graduate teams have independent access to the observatory and its facilities. In addition to research, the observatory hosts public open house viewing nights roughly once a month during the spring and fall semesters.

Primary
The primary telescope, a  diameter Ritchey–Chrétien 8 reflector from DFM Engineering, is the largest optical telescope in Florida.
The  astrosital primary mirror was manufactured by DFM Engineering and the Ultra low expansion glass secondary mirror was built by Brunache Instrumental Optics.

Instruments
The observatory has roughly two dozen scientific grade cameras, mostly from Santa Barbara Instrument Group and Finger Lakes Instruments, with a variety of filters for supporting a wide variety of research needs. The primary instrument, a cryogenically-cooled 4k x 4k x 15 um back-thinned STA4150 CCD from Astronomical Research Cameras, is expected to be fully operational in Fall 2016. Initial testing shows dark current of 1.5 electrons per pixel per hour and less than 3 electrons read-out noise. Two SBIG STX16803 cameras attached to Takahashi piggy-back scopes provide larger field images while a Finger Lakes FLI-4022C attached to an  APM provides a single-shot color image matching the field of a 40mm eyepiece on the primary.

Operation
The primary telescope and its three piggy-back scopes are designed to be operated from a climate-controlled room built into the 5th floor classroom. All four instruments can be operated simultaneously, either from a single computer or from separate machines. The portable veranda telescopes are designed to be operated from a user seated near each pier. A portable pier can be assembled in about 15 minutes while the primary telescope can be imaging in less than five minutes.

See also 

 Embry-Riddle Aeronautical University, Daytona Beach
 List of Astronomical Observatories

References

External links 
 Embry-Riddle Observatory Home Page
 Embry-Riddle Aeronautical University
 Embry-Riddle Telescope Labs

Astronomical observatories in Florida
2005 establishments in Florida
Buildings and structures in Volusia County, Florida